Ariel Rubén Segalla (born February 8, 1976 in Santa Fe, Argentina) is a former Argentine footballer currently playing for clubs of Argentina, Chile and Costa Rica.

Teams
  Colón de Santa Fe 1997-2000
  Palestino 2000-2002
  Universidad de Concepción 2003
  C.S. Cartaginés 2004
  Comunicaciones 2005
  9 de Julio de Rafaela 2005-2006
  Patronato de Paraná 2006-2007
  C.S. Cartaginés 2007
  Luján de Cuyo 2008
  San Luis Quillota 2008-2009

References
 Profile at BDFA 

1976 births
Living people
Argentine footballers
Argentine expatriate footballers
Club Atlético Colón footballers
Comunicaciones F.C. players
C.S. Cartaginés players
Club Deportivo Palestino footballers
Universidad de Concepción footballers
San Luis de Quillota footballers
Chilean Primera División players
Primera B de Chile players
Expatriate footballers in Chile
Expatriate footballers in Costa Rica
9 de Julio de Rafaela players

Association footballers not categorized by position
Footballers from Santa Fe, Argentina